The mining industry of Libya does not contribute significantly to its economy. Mining resources are located in remote regions with limited accessibility. The fuel sector, including oil reserves (which have a capacity of 29.5 billion barrels) and natural gas (which has 1.31 trillion cubic meters of reserve) is the major revenue-generating industry.

Africa's largest proven oil reserves are in Libya. The first well was drilled in 1956 and oil was struck in the following year. The Wadi ash-Shati' may hold one of the world's biggest iron ore deposits.

Production and impact
The identified sources of minerals relate to diamondiferous kimberlites in the East Saharan craton and metamorphic belts with potential for gold in the southern region of the country. Large gypsum deposits have produced 150,000 tons per year for the manufacture of cement. Other sources include sulfur extraction (about 13,000 tons/year) as a byproduct of refining petroleum and natural gas. This has not been extracted due to the remoteness of its location.

Substantial reserves of magnesium and potassium salts have been recorded, but apart from magnetite, phosphate rock, and sulfur, these are yet to be mined. There are large salt flats in the north; production in the 1980s amounted to 11,000 tons of salt per annum. Oil fields include the Bouri Field, the Mediterranean's largest producing oilfield; El Sharara, Elephant, Raguba, Sarir, Waha, and Zelten.

Legal framework
The enabling laws for mining and oil sector are in place. These are: Law 5 on Encouragement of Foreign Capital Investment Law of 1426 (1997) and Law 25 of the Petroleum Law of 1955.

Commodities
Petroleum products are the major industry in Libya, with mineral extraction being limited, and not making up a significant portion of the country's economy. The mining of raw materials is limited mainly to industrial minerals such as clay, cement, salt and limestone. Libya's output in 2000 included 270,000 tons of lime and 175,000 tons of gypsum. Other mineral reserves consist of potash in the Sirte Desert, magnetite, phosphate rock, and sulfur.

See also 

 Energy in Libya
 Libyan oil industry
 National Oil Corporation
 Oil reserves in Libya

References

Mining in Libya
Economy of Libya
Libya